The Peter Greene House is a historic house in Warwick, Rhode Island, USA. The -story wood-frame house was built around 1751, probably by the sons of a militia captain named Peter Greene, and is a rare surviving 18th-century house in Warwick. It has a five-bay facade with a plain door surround, a central chimney, and a rear ell.

The house was listed on the National Register of Historic Places in 1983.

See also
National Register of Historic Places listings in Kent County, Rhode Island

References

Houses completed in 1751
Houses on the National Register of Historic Places in Rhode Island
Houses in Warwick, Rhode Island
National Register of Historic Places in Kent County, Rhode Island
1751 establishments in the Thirteen Colonies